Difucol is a phlorotannin found in the brown algae Analipus japonicus and Cystophora retroflexa.

References 

Phlorotannin dimers